Crawford County is a county located in the U.S. state of Illinois. As of the 2010 census, the population was 19,817. Its county seat is Robinson.

History
Crawford County was formed in the Illinois Territory on December 31, 1816, out of Edwards County. At the time of its formation, it encompassed about one third of the territory, but it was reduced to its present borders by 1831 as it spawned new counties. It was named in honor of William H. Crawford, from Georgia, who was serving as Secretary of War and Secretary of the Treasury at the time.  Crawford County was home to several battles between the settlers and Indians, and also the location of the only woman ever hanged in Illinois.

In 1818, the town of Palestine was designated as the county seat. After elections in 1843, a new site was chosen, which would become the town of Robinson.

Geography
Some of the county's eastern border is defined by the Wabash River.

Climate and weather

Adjacent counties
 Clark County - north
 Sullivan County, Indiana - east
 Knox County, Indiana - southeast
 Lawrence County - south
 Richland County - southwest
 Jasper County - west

Major highways
  Illinois Route 1
  Illinois Route 33

Demographics

As of the 2010 United States Census, there were 19,817 people, 7,763 households, and 5,154 families living in the county. The racial makeup of the county was 92.8% white, 4.7% black or African American, 0.5% Asian, 0.2% American Indian, 0.8% from other races, and 0.9% from two or more races. Those of Hispanic or Latino origin made up 1.8% of the population. In terms of ancestry, 25.0% were German, 14.4% were American, 12.4% were Irish, and 9.9% were English.

Of the 7,763 households, 28.5% had children under the age of 18 living with them, 52.6% were married couples living together, 9.4% had a female householder with no husband present, 33.6% were non-families, and 29.1% of all households were made up of individuals. The average household size was 2.36 and the average family size was 2.88. The median age was 41.7 years.

The median income for a household in the county was $41,434 and the median income for a family was $51,218. Males had a median income of $40,050 versus $30,870 for females. The per capita income for the county was $21,545. About 11.1% of families and 16.9% of the population were below the poverty line, including 27.0% of those under age 18 and 8.2% of those age 65 or over.

Communities

Cities
 Robinson (seat)

Villages
 Flat Rock
 Hutsonville
 Oblong
 Palestine
 Stoy

Census-designated places
 Annapolis
 West York

Townships
Crawford County is divided into ten townships:

 Honey Creek
 Hutsonville
 Lamotte
 Licking
 Martin
 Montgomery
 Oblong
 Prairie
 Robinson
 Southwest

Unincorporated Communities

 Bellair
 Dogwood
 Duncanville
 Gordon
 Green Brier
 Hardinville
 Heathsville
 Kibbie
 Landes
 Morea
 New Hebron
 Oil Center
 Oil Grove
 Pierceburg
 Port Jackson
 Porterville
 Richwoods
 Riddleville
 Trimble
 Villas

Politics
Although Crawford County was solidly Democratic before the Populist-backed candidacy of William Jennings Bryan in 1896, it has since become strongly Republican. The last Democrat to gain a majority in the county was Lyndon Johnson in his 1964 landslide, although Bill Clinton won a plurality in 1992. Like all the rural Upland South, Crawford County has shown dramatic swings against the Democratic Party in recent elections, with Hillary Clinton’s 22.8 percent in 2016 the worst performance ever by a Democrat.

See also
 Fort Lamotte
 National Register of Historic Places listings in Crawford County, Illinois

Sources
 Perrin, William Henry, ed.. History of Crawford and Clark Counties, Illinois Chicago, Illinois. O. L. Baskin & Co. (1883).

References
Specific

General
 United States Census Bureau 2007 TIGER/Line Shapefiles
 United States Board on Geographic Names (GNIS)
 United States National Atlas

External links 
 Crawford County, Illinois History and Genealogy

 
Illinois counties
1816 establishments in Illinois Territory
Populated places established in 1816
Pre-statehood history of Illinois